Nadvoitsy is an urban locality (an urban-type settlement) in Segezhsky District of the Republic of Karelia, Russia, located on the shore of Lake Vygozero,  north of Petrozavodsk, the capital of the republic. As of the 2010 Census, its population was 8,372.

History
It was established in the 16th century. Urban-type settlement status was granted to it in 1942.

Administrative and municipal status
Within the framework of administrative divisions, the urban-type settlement of Nadvoitsy is subordinated to Segezhsky District. As a municipal division, Nadvoitsy, together with six rural localities, is incorporated within Segezhsky Municipal District as Nadvoitskoye Urban Settlement.

Economy

Industry
Until 2013, the only enterprise in Nadvoitsy was the Nadvoitsy Aluminum Plant which belonged to the Rusal group. In 2013, the aluminum production became unprofitable, and the plant stopped operation, with the prospective of being scrapped. Most of the population in Nadvoitsy is unemployed.

Transport
There is a railway station on the railway connecting Petrozavodsk and Murmansk, with infrequent passenger traffic.

Famous residents
 Potapy Emelianov, (c.1889-1936), priest of the Russian Greek Catholic Church, Gulag survivor, and, since 2003, a candidate for Canonization.

References

Notes

Sources

Urban-type settlements in the Republic of Karelia
Segezhsky District
Monotowns in Russia